Dibutoxymethane is an oligoether (more than one -O- grouping) or acetal containing two butyl groups and a methylene grouping. It is used in cosmetics, as a cleansing agent, or solvent. It reduces the formation of soot and nitrogen oxides when added to diesel fuel. It can be classed as a green solvent, as it contains no halogens, and is not very toxic.

References

Formals